Pteria may refer to:

Pteria (Cappadocia) a town in ancient Cappadocia (in modern Turkey)
 Pteria (bivalve) a genus of bivalve molluscs, the winged oysters